Amanda Jean Murphy (born November 16, 1986) is an American fashion model, radiology technologist, and equestrienne. She is best known for being a Prada muse. She has been listed as one of the Top 50 models in the fashion industry by models.com She has been on the cover of Vogue Italia twice.

Early life
She is from Orland Park, Illinois, and is the oldest of 4.

Career
Murphy started her modeling career at 17 after finishing school.

Her breakout year was 2013 where she debuted as a Prada exclusive and Proenza Schouler exclusive.

In addition to her Prada work, she has been in notable advertisements for Céline, DSquared2, Giorgio Armani, and Salvatore Ferragamo.

She has been on the cover of Vogue Italia, Vogue Japan, i-D, V magazine, The Edit by Net-a-Porter, and T: The New York Times Style Magazine.

References 

1986 births
Living people
Female models from Illinois
American female models
IMG Models models
Prada exclusive models
21st-century American women